The Photographic Society of America (PSA) is one of the largest, non-profit organizations of its kind. Established in 1934, it has expanded to include members of over 60 countries.

The mission of this association is to promote and enhance the art and science of photography in all its phases, among members and non-members alike.

The PSA holds several notable competitions throughout the year, including the PSA Youth Showcase.

Presidents of PSA

References

Non-profit organizations based in the United States